Little Bloxwich is a residential area of Bloxwich, West Midlands, England. It is situated in the extreme north of the Metropolitan Borough of Walsall on the border with South Staffordshire, and is one of the more rural parts of the borough.

The area consists predominantly of private housing, mostly built after the Second World War.

The Lower Farm council estate was built at Little Bloxwich in the 1960s on the site of a farm called Lower Farm.

References

Walsall